Baba Joon is a 2015 Israeli drama film directed by Yuval Delshad. It was screened in the Contemporary World Cinema section of the 2015 Toronto International Film Festival. It won the award for Best Film at the 2015 Ophir Awards and became Israel's entry for the Best Foreign Language Film at the 88th Academy Awards but it was not nominated.

Plot 
The film tells the story of a Jewish-Iranian family of three generations in an agricultural settlement in the Negev, where all the inhabitants immigrated from Iran. Yitzchak runs a turkey farm that he took over from his father. His 13-year-old son Moti is supposed to take over the business one day, but he is not interested in poultry and would rather become a car mechanic instead. The unresolved future of the business and a visit from Jitzchak's brother from the USA exacerbate the already existing tensions between the immigrant (parents and grandparents) and Israeli-born generations.

Cast
 Navid Negahban
 David Diaan
 Viss Elliot Safavi
 Asher Avrahami
 Elias Rafael

See also
 List of submissions to the 88th Academy Awards for Best Foreign Language Film
 List of Israeli submissions for the Academy Award for Best Foreign Language Film

References

External links
 

2015 films
2015 drama films
Israeli drama films
Persian-language films